The World Scholar’s Cup (abbreviated WSC) is an international team academic program with more than 15,000 students participating from over 65 countries every year. The program was founded by DemiDec, in particular by Daniel Berdichevsky, in 2006. First taking place in South Korea in 2007 at the Hankuk Academy of Foreign Studies, the World Scholar's Cup aims to teach students with interesting, not-taught-in-schools lesson, and finding common ground between people of different statuses.

Tournament format

A team for the World Scholar's Cup is generally composed of three students from the same or different schools, however teams of two or mixed-school teams are permitted too. Teams may participate in any regional round. If teams are unable to attend a regional round, but would still like to participate in the Global Round, they may qualify for a wildcard.

To qualify for the annual Global Round, teams must do one of the following:
Exceed a point threshold at a Regional Round (usually 20,000)
Earn a wildcard at a Regional Round (through strong point performance)
Apply for an exceptional wildcard (granted only in narrow circumstances)

To qualify to the Tournament of Champions (ToC) at Yale University, New Haven, teams must:
Exceed a point threshold at a Global Round (which is usually around 22,000 points but may vary)
All members have qualified at a Global Round
Two members in a team must have been teammates at the Global Round they qualified from

The tournament is divided into junior and senior divisions, and participation in a division depends on the ages of the students of a team. Participants who are 14 years of age or older are classified as senior. In the 2017 Hanoi Global Round, a new Skittles Division, was formed, for kids aged 8–12. In regional rounds, both divisions participate separately but simultaneously, while global rounds have the events of each division staggered, where the junior division competing in an event a day before the seniors' event. Closing ceremonies are held separately as well.

Events 
Each Regional Round consists of four main events: the Scholar's Challenge, Collaborative Writing, The Team Debate, and the Scholar's Bowl. In addition to these four main events, non-competitive activities take place in select tournaments. These activities are both social and academic. The academic activities each require knowledge of a curriculum made at the start of each season, which is divided into a section about history, social studies, art and music, literature and media, science and technology, and a special area.

Team Events 
Source:

The Scholar's Challenge 
The Scholar's Challenge is a 120-question multiple choice exam given to each individual competitor to complete within 60 minutes.  Prizes are awarded to top participants in each subject and to both top-scoring overall teams and individuals.

A feature of the Scholar's Challenge implemented in 2015 allows participants to select multiple answers per question. Though each question has only one correct answer, choosing multiple answers allows the participant to earn points inversely proportional to the number of answers chosen. For example, if a participant chose one single answer, and if it was correct, they would score a point; if they chose two answers and one was correct, they would score 1/2 a point; if they chose three and one was correct, they would score 1/3 of a point, and so forth. If time was running out, a participant can shade in all five answers and automatically win 1/5 of a point.

Collaborative Writing 
This part is based on arguments, with students picking one of six different prompts. Each participant on a team must pick a different prompt. Participants pick one side of a topic and write for, against, or about it critically, providing evidence to support their claims using any resources available to them, with the exception of social media and communicating with people other than their teammates.

At the beginning of the event, students have 30 minutes to work with their teammates to discuss and research their arguments. Following the collaboration period, students have 45 minutes to write their essay. There is no word minimum or maximum, and students are expected to cite sources. Following the writing period, students then have 15 minutes to collaborate again with their teammates to edit one another's work, but they may not finish a teammate's essay.

Team Debate 
All teams have assigned rooms and arguments. In the room, teams will have 15 minutes to confer within the room before the debate begins. Teams may use World Scholar's Cup materials or any outside resources to prepare.

Each debater will stand in front of the room for the length of his/her speech. Speakers may use notes, but should not read their speeches in their entirety. Students may speak for up to four minutes, however there is no penalty for speaking up to four minutes. The judge will signal time left using knocks, with two knocks meaning the speaker must stop speaking. Between speakers, teams will have 60 seconds to prepare before the next speaker is called.

Before the end of the debate, the competing teams are required to give positive and constructive feedback to the opposing team for roughly 90 seconds, before the judge(s) announce a winning team. The winning team will then proceed to a designated room and the non-winning team to a different designated room, where each will face another team with the same number of wins and non-wins.

One cultural aspect of the debate is the 'lollipop'. In order to promote positivity and self-improvement, the World Scholar's Cup had replaced the term 'losing' with 'lollipopping' since 2015. This change was also reflected in the debate schedules that each team receives.

The Scholar's Bowl 

The Scholar's Bowl is a quiz bowl usually held in a theater. Team members work together to answer multiple choice questions that are displayed on a large screen.

In order to answer the questions, each team of students is given a clicker that connects to a scoring computer on stage. Students then choose their answer by pressing their choice letter on the clicker. Students are given 15 seconds to submit their answer. The questions gets harder each time and worth more points than the previous one. There are sometimes rapid fire questions which have to be answered in 5 seconds, worth even more points.

The Scholar's Bowl implements many types of questions, many tend to include references to pop culture, and often include WSC in-jokes. This is often the last educational event of the competition before the awards ceremony.

Community Events 
Source:

The Scholar's Scavenge 
The Scholar's Scavenge is an annual scavenger hunt at the Global Round and the ToC, and first took place in 2009 in Singapore.

Students are teamed up randomly and given tasks. At least one person in the team has a camera, and the tasks are completed by taking photos and videos. The tasks may relate to the curriculum, teamwork, organizer, or just silly. Each task is worth a certain number of points depending upon the difficulty. At the end of the scavenge, the leader collects the photos and score them. These scores do not count toward the scores in the competition as a whole, but are only used for this event. Teams with the highest scores can be called for an award in an award ceremony.

The Debate Showcase 

Debate Showcase is an additional event, with the round's top 8 junior and senior debaters take part in this event. At Regional Rounds there is only one Debate Showcase with both juniors and seniors taking part. Regardless, 8 students debate in each Showcase.

The format mirrors the debate's format, but the students instead debate on stage in front of the rest of the participants. When all six speakers have gone, the host of the Showcase invites volunteers from the audience and debaters from the showcase to step forward and share their general thoughts on the topic that was debated.

Additionally, top-scoring round debate participants are the judging panel for the Showcase. When it ends, the panel announce the winners.

The Scholar's Ball 
The Scholar's Ball was first added to the tournament in 2011 at the Global Round in Kuala Lumpur, Malaysia. The idea spawned from a conversation about the competition where one party misheard "Scholar's Bowl" as "Scholar's Ball".

The Scholar's Ball encourages mingling, dancing, and the chance to "look sharp". Students are required to come in formal wear. Some students refer to it as a "pseudo-prom" or "nerd-prom". It was introduced to allow students mingle with students from different countries.

The Scholar's Show 
 
The first Scholar's Show occurred in 2010 at the regional round held in Dubai, United Arab Emirates. It originated from several students playing "We Will Rock You" playing during an intermission. When the song was over, Berdichevsky invited any student wanting to showcase their talent to come forward.

Student performances range from vocal and instrumental performances to beat boxing, dancing, drinking hot sauce and magic tricks. The Scholar's Show is held at all two-day rounds, and at each Global Round and the Tournament of Champions.

Flag March 
The Flag March happens at the end of every Global Round and ToC before the Awards Ceremony. In the Flag March, there is one representative (flag bearer) from every country participating. The flag bearers carry the flag of their country and march to the stage, followed by a staff giving a farewell speech.

The World Scholar's Camp 
In 2012, the World Scholar's Camp was created, and took place in Singapore in December 2012. It included seminars and outings to various locations in Singapore.

Camps take place at various schools and cities through the year.

Awards Ceremony

The Awards Ceremony, also known as the Closing Ceremony, takes place just before the end of a round. Traditionally, staff members stand on stage and announce the winners for the entire round. Winners either get a gold medal, silver medal, a pineapple (another form of trophy), or a trophy. The winner of the round gets the tallest trophy, and gets to interact with the props on the stage. Da Vinci Awards are given to scholars who did not receive a gold medal or trophy during the prize ceremony. Weeks later, a certificate will be shipped to all participants.

Very Emotional Farewell To The Year's Theme 

Began in 2018 ToC, with scholars together saying emotive byes to the Havana theme and destroying the set of it, the Very Emotional Farewell To The Year's Theme is an event where scholars and staffs ultimately destroy the year's theme in a (hopefully) non-violent way. The event happens at every ToC at the New Haven Green.

Curriculum

The World Scholar's Cup curriculum has six subjects. The theme changes annually. Students are often given questions that require critical thinking skills as well as their basic knowledge to come to a conclusion rather than focusing on memorization. For instance, instead of asking on which date an experiment was performed, the question would ask, "Which artist would be most likely to oppose this experiment?"

The subjects are:

 Science & Technology
 Literature & Media
 Art & Music
 Special Area (custom each year)
 History
 Social Studies

Until 2009, mathematics, economics, and trigonometry was included in the curriculum. However, in 2010 it was eliminated in order to better address the goals of the competition stating that it is inflexible and difficult to debate. In 2008, the World Scholar's Cup added a 'film' category to its visual arts section, and in 2010 added a "music" category to its art section.

Until 2013, the World Scholar's Cup released curriculum guides each year—one for each subject. The guides were available free-of-charge on its official website. Starting in 2013, topic outlines and theme-relevant material was made freely available to students through their website. The World Scholar's Cup recommends connecting each section of the outline to the given theme and how they connect or impact society.

Until 2014, there was a Current Affairs section, which was replaced by Social Studies. To address its absence, Current Affairs would from thereon out be integrated across all six subjects instead.

Champions 
Source:

Overall Individual Champions

Seniors

Juniors

Overall Team Champions

Seniors

Juniors

Coach of The Year

Alpaca Scholar of the Year

Cria Scholar of the Year

Alpaca of the Year

MVP

See also 

 Mediated intercultural communication

Notes

References

External links 
 World Scholar's Cup official website

DemiDec
Competitions
Companies based in Los Angeles
International competitions